Montelapiano is a comune and town in the Province of Chieti in the Abruzzo region of Italy. It is the smallest non alpine commune (not belonging to the regions of Piedmont, Valle d'Aosta, Lombardy, Veneto, Trentino-Alto Adige/Südtirol or Friuli Venezia Giulia) in Italy by population.

References

Cities and towns in Abruzzo